Wolfgang Amadeus Mozart wrote seventeen Church Sonatas (sonate da chiesa), also known as Epistle Sonatas, between 1772 and 1780.  These are short single-movement pieces intended to be played during a celebration of the Mass between the Epistle and the Gospel (hence the name that is sometimes attributed to them: sonatas of the epistle).  Three of the sonatas include more orchestral scoring including oboes, horns, trumpets and timpani and the rest are scored for organ and strings (with no violas).  In eight of the sonatas (K 224/241a, 225/241b, 244, 245, 263, 328/317c, 329/317a and 336/336d), the organ has an obbligato solo part and in the other nine, the organ accompanies along with the basso continuo.

Most of these pieces would be inserted into any mass setting of the appropriate key.  Those requiring more instruments than the standard "Salzburg Church Quartet" are meant to go with specific mass settings that have that instrumentation.

Shortly after Mozart left Salzburg, the Archbishop mandated that an appropriate choral motet or congregational hymn be sung at that point in the liturgy, and the "Epistle Sonata" fell into disuse.

Notes

External links

Sonatas by Wolfgang Amadeus Mozart
Catholic music